Owen Clark Falconis Lima (born 25 February 2000) is an Uruguayan professional footballer who plays as a forward for Uruguayan Primera División club Cerrito, on loan from Defensor Sporting.

Career
Falconis made his professional debut on 25 May 2019 in a 2–4 loss against Fénix. He replaced Nicolás González in the 67th minute of the game and scored a goal.

Falconis is a former Uruguayan youth international. He was part of Uruguay squad at 2017 South American U-17 Championship.

References

External links
 

Living people
2000 births
Footballers from Montevideo
Association football forwards
Uruguayan footballers
Uruguay youth international footballers
Uruguayan Primera División players
Segunda División B players
Defensor Sporting players
Salamanca CF UDS players
Uruguayan expatriate footballers
Uruguayan expatriate sportspeople in Spain
Expatriate footballers in Spain